Isseroda is a village and a former municipality in the Weimarer Land district of Thuringia, Germany. Since December 2019, it is part of the municipality Grammetal.

References

Weimarer Land
Grand Duchy of Saxe-Weimar-Eisenach
Former municipalities in Thuringia